This is the discography of Sido, a German rapper from Berlin.

Albums

Studio albums

Live albums

Compilations

Collaborations 

Royal TS / A.i.d.S.
 1998: Wissen ~ Flow ~ Talent
 2000: Back in Dissniss
 2001: Das Mic und Ich (EP)
 2002: Alles ist die Sekte Album Nr. 3
 2003: Gar nich so schlimm! (EP)

Die Sekte

 1999: Sintflows
 2009: Die Sekte – Christmas Edition

Singles

Solo singles

Featured singles

Guest appearances 

 2002: Jede Frau ist eine Plage from Mein Kampf by King Orgasmus One
 2002: Plan B & Samba from Der Neger (In mir) by B-Tight
 2002: Armageddon, Gangster Gangster, Männer & Rap Frankenstein from Tag der Abrechnung by King Orgasmus One
 2003: Renn from Vom Bordstein bis zur Skyline by Bushido
 2004: Zum Teufel mit den Regeln from Einblick 3
 2004: Alle wollen cool sein from Neukölln Hustler by MOK
 2004: Oh Shit Remix from Aggroberlina by Fler
 2004: Taxi, Taxi from Sparring by Olli Banjo
 2004: Lauf from Über alles in der Welt by Hecklah & Coch
 2005: Hände hoch from Epos by Battlerapp
 2005: Mach dir keinen Kopf from Das Mixtape by MC Bogy
 2005: 10 Minuten from Shizogenie by Olli Banjo
 2005: Whisper from The Blue Tape by Plattenpapzt
 2005: Badesong & Salam Alajkum (Boogie Down Berlin) from Numma Eyns by DJ Tomekk
 2005: Playboy & Abtörn Görl from Neue Deutsche Welle by Fler
 2005: Deine Lieblingsrapper from Threeshot by J-Luv
 2005: Die Sekte from Muzik oder Knast by MOK
 2006: Willkommen in Berlin Remix & Mein Viertel from F.L.E.R. 90210 by Fler
 2006: Freundentränen Remix, Der neue Standard & DLR Inferno from Der neue Standard by Beathoavenz
 2006: Für den Hustler from Bad Boys by MOK
 2006: Back in the Days from Bad Boys 2 by MOK
 2006: Königsklasse from Sparring 2 by Olli Banjo
 2006: So bin ich from Berliner Schnauze by Bass Sultan Hengzt
 2006: Ruff Sex Part 1 & 2 & Kein Hunger mehr from Nichts ist umsonst by Don Tone
 2006: Eierlecken from Orgi Pörnchen 4 – Der Soundtrack by King Orgasmus One
 2006: Verrückt wie krass from Trendsetter by Fler
 2006: Scheiß auf deinen Club from Blut gegen Blut by Massiv
 2006: Titten & Popo'z from Aggrogant by G-Hot
 2007: Was ist Beef?! from Airmax Muzik by Fler
 2007: Zaster, Zaster from Willkommen in Abschaumcity by MC Bogy
 2007: Straßenmukke from Straßenmukke by MOK
 2007: Seelenfrieden from Der Schmetterlingseffekt by Bass Sultan Hengzt
 2007: 100% Sektenmuzik & Psychose auf Psychose by Grüne Medizin
 2007: Yes Sir from Retro by Sir Colin
 2007: Halt dein Maul &Auf und ab from Wir nehmen auch Euro by DJ Sweap & Pfund 500
 2007: Geld im Portemonee from Ein Level weiter by Greckoe
 2007: Aggrostarz 2007 from Juice Vol. 100
 2007: Clubmud from Alles oder nichts by Jom & Said
 2007: Asozialen Lifestyle from Aus Liebe zum Spiel by Snaga & Pillath
 2007: Kettenreaktion from GBZ Oholika 3 by Spezializtz
 2007: Weiterlaufen & Kuck! from Geladen und Entsichert by Alpa Gun
 2007: Keiner kann was machen from Ghetto Romantik by B-Tight
 2007: Rockwilder und Clubmud from Harryge Angelegenheit by Harris
 2007: Auf und ab und Knochen gebrochen from Totalschaden by Tony D
 2007: Straßenmucke Remix from Hustler by MOK
 2007: Ich brauch schlaf from 80's Flashback
 2007: Hör nicht auf from Neger Neger by B-Tight
 2007: Ich leb meinen Traum from Killatape 2 by Automatikk
 2008: Chefsache & Therapie from Fremd im eigenen Land by Fler
 2008: Bevor ich geh from Deutschrap Hooligan by Joe Rilla
 2008: Das ist Hip Hop from Ecko Unltd. Mixtape Vol. 1
 2008: Schaukelpferd from Goldständer by B-Tight
 2008: Ghettopräsident 2 from Jenseits von Eden by Automatikk
 2008: Swagger like us from Ab in Club by Harris, DJ Sweap & Pfund 500
 2008: Schlaflos from Südberlin Maskulin by Frank White & Godsilla
 2008: Der Aufstand from Aufstand auf den billigen Plätzen by Alpa Gun
 2008: A.i.d.S from Orgi Pörnchen 5 – Der Soundtrack by King Orgasmus One
 2008: Ein bisschen mehr from Typisch Griechisch by Greckoe
 2008: Puff Puff from Zwiespalt (Grau) von MC Basstard
 2008: Lass scheppern & Die Sekte from 2 Chaoten by Fuhrman & Bendt
 2008: Beste from Zu zweit allein by Marsimoto
 2009: Fire from Der blonde Türke by G-Hot
 2009: Du brauchst mich & Aggro Collabo from Check mich aus by Fler
 2009: Macht und Ruhm from Fler by Fler
 2009: Für die Sekte & Keine Gegnaz from Für die Gegnaz! by Tony D
 2009: Das ist die Straße from Der Ghettotraum in Handarbeit by Massiv
 2009: Straßenmucke 2009 from Most Wanted by MOK
 2009: Nicht mit mir from Zahltag by Bass Sultan Hengzt
 2009: Mit dir from Miyo! by Kitty Kat
 2009: Das System from Sexismus gegen Rechts by K.I.Z
 2009: Alles tamam from Volume Maximum by Killa Hakan
 2009: Einlauf from Des rois, des pions et des fous by Stress
 2009: Bock auf'n Beat from International by Hassan Annouri
 2010: Sor Bir Bana & Zerbrochenes Glas from Almanci by Alpa Gun
 2010: Musik ist unser Leben, darum wurden wir Erzieher from Wir sind Freunde und darum machen wir Musik by Hammer & Zirkel
 2010: Stell dir eine Welt vor… from Der Mann im Haus by Harris
 2010: Hier spielt die Musik from Mein Hip-Hop, das Business & ich by Greckoe
 2010: Alles gut from Backpack Inferno by Laas Unltd.
 2010: Ne Leiche from Kontrastprogramm by SDP
 2011: Sand bei from Two and a half men EP 2 by Hammer & Zirkel & Liquid Walker
 2011: Intro (Ein Fall für zwei) from Ein Fall für zwei by DJ Sweap und DJ Pfund 500
 2012: Wie war das noch mal 2012 from Silber by DCS
 2012: Braun, grün, lila from Kanackis by Haftbefehl
 2012: Hol die Nadel raus from Unter die Haut by Lonyen
 2012: Born to ball from This is me by Cals
 2012: Faxen mit den Jungs from Roboblokk by Blokkmonsta
 2012: Cool & Ruhig from Narkose by Nazar
 2012: Die Nacht von Freitag auf Montag from Die bekannteste unbekannte Band der Welt by SDP
 2012: Mary Jane from Drinne by B-Tight
 2012: Das echte Leben from AMYF by Bushido
 2013: Bombe, Feuer, Benzin by Liquit Walker & Bass Sultan Hengzt
 2013: 90 BPM from Unter Wölfen by Liquit Walker
 2013: Liebs oder lass es from D.N.A. by Genetikk
 2013: Nackte Gewalt from Ob du willst oder nicht by Sinan G
 2013: Lieb mich & Soso from Ein bisschen Shizoe by Shizoe
 2013: Immer immer mehr from NWA by Shindy
 2013: Guten Morgen (King Remix) from Guten Morgen Single by Eko Fresh
 2013: Aschenflug from Lieder by Adel Tawil
 2014: Blockparty (Remix) from Blackbook II by Laas Unltd.
 2014: Halt Stop from Endlich erwachsen by Bass Sultan Hengzt
 2014: Job verloren from Dynamit by Olli Banjo
 2014: Au revoir from Bauch und Kopf by Mark Forster
 2014: Strom from MB3 by Manuellsen
 2014: Schüsse in die Luft from Camouflage by Nazar
 2014: Tattoo from Peace by MC Fitti
 2014: Gheddo Reloaded from Deutscher Traum by Eko Fresh
 2014: Saudi Arabi Money Rich (Babo Remix) from Russisch Roulette by Haftbefehl
 2015: Eazy from Retro by B-Tight
 2015: Best Day from Crystals by Eskimo Callboy
 2015: Schwitze im Bugatti from Masta by Olexesh
 2015: Bobby & Siggi Skit from Alles ist die Säcke by Die Säcke
 2015: Kein Bock from #Derbe by Denyo
 2015: Für immer Kind from Für immer Wochenende by Weekend
 2015: Don't legalize from Achter Tag by Genetikk
 2015: Kaltes Wasser from Mama by MoTrip
 2015: Pablo Picasso from Meister der Zeremonie by MC Basstard

Others and diss tracks 
 2003: Mein Block (Beathoavenz Remix) (Juice Exclusive! auf Juice-CD #36)
 2005: Meine Lieblingsrapper (mit Blumio) (Juice Exclusive! auf der Juice-CD #58)
 2005: G mein Weg (Juice Exclusive! auf Juice-CD #50)
 2007: Strassenmucke (mit MOK) (Juice Exclusive! auf Juice-CD #72)
 2009: Frohe Weihnachten (feat. Alpa Gun) (Disstrack)
 2010: Henker & Richter (Freetrack)
 2010: Pistole (feat. Kitty Kat) (Freetrack)
 2010: 2010 (feat. Haftbefehl) (Freetrack)

Productions 
 2002: Intro, Aggro, Arschficksong & Alles ist die Sekte auf Aggro Ansage Nr. 1 (Sampler)
 2002: Samba und Plan B auf Der Neger von B-Tight
 2003: Relax auf Aggro Ansage Nr. 2 (Sampler)
 2003: Neu!, Safe Sex, Sido und B-Tight, MV, Ich mach das, Garnich so schlimm, Alles oder nix und Outro (zusammen mit Beatight) auf Garnich so schlimm von A.i.d.S
 2003: Renn auf Vom Bordstein bis zur Skyline von Bushido
 2004: Ausm Weg, Maske, Mama ist stolz & Knast auf Maske von Sido
 2004: Aggroberlina (Remix) auf Aggroberlina (Single) von Fler
 2004: Zum Teufel mit den Regeln von Die Sekte auf Einblick 3
 2005: Scheiß drauf,Berlin Paris und Freunde auf Heisse Ware von B-Tight & Tony D
 2005: Te Typy auf Drewnianej Małpy Rock von Don Guralesko
 2006: Jungs im Viertel auf Papa ist zurück (Single) von Fler
 2006: Paradies auf Aggro Ansage Nr. 3 X von Aggro Berlin
 2006: Eier lecken auf Orgi Pörnchen 4 von King Orgasmus
 2006: Mein Befehl von Alpa Gun auf Das Beste von MOK
 2007: 2 Chaoten und Krimineller Westberliner auf Sektenmuzik – Der Sampler (Sampler)
 2007: Big Boss auf Ausländer (Single) von Alpa Gun
 2007: Anam Icin auf Juice Vol. 75 von Alpa Gun
 2007: Blaulicht und Die wilden Kerle auf Geladen & Entsichert von Alpa Gun
 2007: Schmetterlingseffekt (Remix) auf Schmetterlingseffekt (Single) von Bass Sultan Hengzt
 2007: Klopf Klopf auf Totalschaden von Tony D
 2008: Der Wendepunkt auf Typisch griechisch von Greckoe
 2008: Blas mir einen (zusammen mit Djorkaeff & Beatzarre) und Sexy (zusammen mit Djorkaeff, Beatzarre & Beatight) auf Aggro Ansage Nr. 8 von Aggro Berlin
 2009: Haze auf Die Sekte von Die Sekte

Videography

DVDs

Music videos 
 2001: Hältst du es aus? (with Die Sekte)
 2002: Westberlin (Sido & B-Tight)
 2003: Safe Sex (Sido & B-Tight)
 2003: Aggro Teil 2 (Sido, Bushido & B-Tight)
 2003: Weihnachtssong
 2004: Hände hoch (Gilles K feat. Sido)
 2004: Steig ein/Mein Block (Beathoavenz Remix)
 2004: Fuffies im Club (Sido feat. Harris)
 2004: Aggro Gold/Neue Deutsche Welle/Aggro Teil 4 (Splitvideo) (Sido, Fler & B-Tight)
 2005: Mama ist stolz
 2005: Steh wieder auf (Sido & Harris)
 2005: Gib mir die Flasche (Sido & Harris)
 2005: Wir bewahren die Haltung (Sido & Harris)
 2005: Wahlkampf (Sido & G-Hot)
 2006: Straßenjunge
 2006: Sureshot (Tomcraft feat. Sido & Tai Jason)
 2007: Was ist Beef (Fler feat. Sido & Alpa Gun)
 2007: Ein Teil von mir
 2007: Schlechtes Vorbild
 2007: Kettenreaktion (Spezializtz feat. Sido)
 2007: Wir reißen den Club ab (Hecklah & Coch feat. Sido)
 2007: Keiner kann was machen (B-Tight feat. Sido, Fler & Tony D)
 2008: So machen wir das (Sido, Alpa Gun & Greckoe)
 2008: Augen auf
 2008: Halt dein Maul
 2008: Carmen
 2008: Herz
 2008: Ghettopräsident (Automatikk feat. Sido, Bass Sultan Hengzt & Alpa Gun)
 2008: Hundert Metaz/5 krasse Rapper/So is es (Splitvideo) (Sido, Fler, B-Tight, Tony D & Kitty Kat)
 2009: Geht nicht, gibts nicht (feat. Alpa Gun)
 2009: Beweg dein Arsch (feat. Tony D und Kitty Kat)
 2009: Das System (die kleinen Dinge) (K.I.Z feat. Sido)
 2009: Hey du
 2009: Hollywood
 2009: Geburtstag
 2009: Rockstarz (with Die Sekte)
 2010: Der Tanz (with K.I.Z)
 2010: Sie bleibt
 2010: Der Himmel soll warten (feat. Adel Tawil)
 2010: Da Da Da (feat. Stephan Remmler)
 2010: 2010 (feat. Haftbefehl)
 2011: Kein morgen (feat. Nazar & RAF 3.0)
 2011: So mach ich es (with Bushido)
 2011: Erwachsen sein (with Bushido feat. Peter Maffay)
 2011: Geboren um frei zu sein (with Rio Reiser)

Record certifications

Notes

References 

Hip hop discographies
Discographies of German artists